Norbornadiene is an organic compound and a bicyclic hydrocarbon. Norbornadiene is of interest as a metal-binding  ligand, whose complexes are useful for homogeneous catalysis. It has been intensively studied owing to its high reactivity and distinctive structural property of being a diene that cannot isomerize (isomers would be anti-Bredt alkenes). Norbornadiene is also a useful dienophile in Diels-Alder reactions.

Synthesis 
Norbornadiene can be formed by a Diels-Alder reaction between cyclopentadiene and acetylene

Reactions 
Quadricyclane, a valence isomer, can be obtained from norbornadiene by a photochemical reaction when assisted by a sensitizer such as acetophenone:

The norbornadiene-quadricyclane couple is of potential interest for solar energy storage when controlled release of the strain energy stored in quadricyclane back to norbornadiene is made possible.

Norbornadiene is reactive in cycloaddition reactions.  Norbornadiene is also the starting material for the synthesis of diamantane and sumanene and it is used as an acetylene transfer agent for instance in reaction with 3,6-di-2-pyridyl-1,2,4,5-tetrazine.

As a ligand
Norbornadiene is a versatile ligand in organometallic chemistry, where it serves as a two-electron or four-electron donor. (Norbornadiene)molybdenum tetracarbonyl is used as a source of "Mo(CO)4", exploiting the lability of the diene ligand in this case. which is a useful source of "chromium tetracarbonyl," e.g. in reactions with phosphine ligands.

The norbornadiene analogue of cyclooctadiene rhodium chloride dimer has been used in homogeneous catalysis. Chiral, C2-symmetric dienes derived from norbornadiene have also been described.

See also 
Norbornane a saturated compound with the same carbon skeleton. 
Norbornene a compound with the same carbon skeleton, but with one less double bond.

References 

Dienes
Bicyclic compounds
Cyclopentenes